Ouvrage Col du Granon is a lesser work (petit ouvrage) of the Maginot Line's Alpine extension, the Alpine Line. The ouvrage consists of one entry block, one infantry block and one observation block covering the Col du Granon as part of the defenses of Briançon and Grenoble.

Description 
See Fortified Sector of the Dauphiné for a broader discussion of the Dauphiné sector of the Alpine Line.
Block 1 (entry): two machine gun embrasures.
Block 2 (unbuilt): one MOM block for a Hotchkiss machine gun.
Block 3 (infantry): one machine gun cloche, one light and one heavy twin machine gun embrasure.
Block 4 (infantry): one machine gun/observation cloche.
Annex: a small flanking position, unique in the Maginot Line, with one twin Reibel machine gun emplacement.

See also 
 List of Alpine Line ouvrages

References

Bibliography 
Allcorn, William. The Maginot Line 1928-45. Oxford: Osprey Publishing, 2003. 
Kaufmann, J.E. and Kaufmann, H.W. Fortress France: The Maginot Line and French Defenses in World War II, Stackpole Books, 2006. 
Kaufmann, J.E., Kaufmann, H.W., Jancovič-Potočnik, A. and Lang, P. The Maginot Line: History and Guide, Pen and Sword, 2011. 
Mary, Jean-Yves; Hohnadel, Alain; Sicard, Jacques. Hommes et Ouvrages de la Ligne Maginot, Tome 4 - La fortification alpine. Paris, Histoire & Collections, 2009.  
Mary, Jean-Yves; Hohnadel, Alain; Sicard, Jacques. Hommes et Ouvrages de la Ligne Maginot, Tome 5. Paris, Histoire & Collections, 2009.

External links 
 Granon (petit ouvrage de) at fortiff.be 
 

COLG
Maginot Line
Alpine Line
Fortifications of Briançon